Statistics of Swiss Super League in the 1934–35 season.

Overview
It was contested by 14 teams, and Lausanne Sports won the championship.

League standings

Results

Sources 
 Switzerland 1934-35 at RSSSF

Nationalliga seasons
Swiss
1934–35 in Swiss football